Senggarang is the name of a small village on the island of Bintan, Indonesia, which houses the oldest temple in the Kepri region. Locals believe Senggarang was the first home for Chinese immigrants a long time ago, who then spread throughout the other island of Kepri.

Tanjungpinang
Villages in Indonesia
Populated places in the Riau Islands